Stabilo may refer to:
 Schwan-Stabilo, a global maker of writing, highlighting and coloring pens
 Stabilo (band), a Canadian musical group
 Stabilo Boss (album), the self-titled album by Stabilo Boss (now Stabilo)
 Stabilo (rocket), of ARCASPACE industries